Pacific Environment is an environmental organization based in San Francisco, California, United States, founded in 1987. Its objective is to protect the living environment of the Pacific Rim.

History

The organization was founded 1987 as Pacific Energy and Resources Center by Armin Rosencranz. In 1991, Pacific Environment became the first international organization to bring widespread attention to the threats facing the Siberian taiga, beginning a long history of work in Russia. In 1993, a Pacific Environment campaign with Russian partners led to the creation of the Botcha Nature Reserve, protecting valuable forests in the Russian Far East that were to be logged by Weyerhaeuser Corporation. That same year, Pacific Environment worked with the Udege people in the Russian Far East to protect the three-million-acre (1.2-million-hectare) upper Bikin Watershed against logging by the Hyundai Corporation. This area is now a wildlife refuge.

By the mid-1990s, they began to focus on the linchpin financial role international institutions were playing in resource extraction in Russia and initiated a long-term effort to link grassroots environmentalists around the Pacific Rim to international policy decisions, particularly those of government-supported export credit agencies. Pacific Environment pioneered efforts to block the financing of destructive projects and improve others as one of the founding members of an international campaign to reform the social and environmental policies of export credit agencies, in a program dubbed ECA Watch. While Pacific Environment's biggest successes in the 1990s were in Russia, they also began to focus more broadly on the Pacific Rim.

In China, Pacific Environment took advantage of the growing opportunities to partner with that country's emerging environmental movement by helping dozens of local groups become more effective watchdogs of local government, especially through the media. They also assisted these groups in encouraging the Chinese government to review environmental impacts. Pacific Environment's partners at Greener Beijing utilized the internet to organize a campaign against consumption of turtle and tortoise species in the Hainan Province. After a government investigation prompted in part by the campaign, the Hainan Yang Sheng Tan Company halted its import of turtle and tortoise species after financial losses and public pressure. And in 2004, Chinese Premiere Wen Jiabao ordered officials to reconsider plans for a dam along the Nu River, after journalists and environmentalists teamed up to spotlight the issue.

Organisation
Pacific Environment employs 16 employees located throughout the Pacific Rim with offices in San Francisco, California; Anchorage, Alaska; Washington DC; and Beijing, China. The reported operating budget for the 2011–2012 fiscal year was $2.4 million,  with the majority of that coming from foundations.

Pacific Environment splits its activities between five main programs: Climate Program, China Program, Alaska Program, California Energy Program, and Responsible Finance Program.

Programs
Pacific Environment takes on specific challenges in key geographic areas throughout the Pacific Rim, and employs key international leverage points to bolster local campaigns. They engage in five major areas of focus outlined below.

Russia
Until 2018, Pacific Environment had partnered with Russian environmentalists to ensure the peoples in these regions have a voice in decisions that impact their environment, health and livelihoods. Pacific Environment worked alongside Russian and international nonprofits to protect wild lands and wildlife, promote responsible fisheries management, and advocate environmental controls on oil, gas and minerals development.

China
Pacific Environment enhances the Chinese environmental movement by:
 providing partners renewed financial support to hire and retain staff enhancing both their professional capacity and efficacy in accomplishing their advocacy and civil society goals.
 organizing a network for partners to share experiences and information relevant to their water pollution work through biannual workshops and regular consultation with each other and with Pacific Environment
 assisting partners in developing communications strategies that will enable them to generate media attention on local efforts to fight water pollution.

Alaska
Pacific Environment's Alaska Program partners with native, fishing, environmental, and scientific communities to confront cultural and environmental threats to Alaska and the surrounding waters. These partnerships focus on safeguarding critical habitats, including the world's largest salmon run, the feeding grounds of the endangered northeastern Pacific right whale, old-growth seafloor habitat, and areas essential to community subsistence. The three key campaign goals are:
 Prevent all offshore oil and gas exploration and drilling in Bristol Bay and the Beaufort and Chukchi Seas
 Dramatically increase shipping safety response and prevention plans along the Great Circle Route
 Facilitate an international coalition of stakeholders to protect the unique biodiversity of the Bering Sea

California Energy
Pacific Environment's California energy program works to maintain California's commitment to clean energy and reducing greenhouse gases by:
 Keeping liquefied natural gas out of the West Coast
 Promoting Community Choice, a plan that would allow San Francisco and the East Bay cities of Oakland, Emeryville, and Berkeley to buy up to 50% of their cities' electricity from off-grid renewable sources
 Retrofitting aging, polluting power plants to increase energy efficiency and reduce overall energy demands

Responsible Finance
Pacific Environment's Responsible Finance Campaign promotes environmentally and socially sustainable policies and practices among public and private finance institutions with interests and projects in less wealthy countries. With a principal focus on the extractive sector (oil, gas, mining, and forestry) operating on the Pacific Rim, Pacific Environment works to persuade these lending institutions to be more open, accountable, and responsive to citizens’ concerns, particularly in project-affected communities.

The international campaign to reform the policies and practices of public and private banks has expanded its focus to include multilateral development banks, export credit agencies, and large private international banks. After a decade of campaigning, a basic environmental policy framework is now in place for each of the three classes of institutions. However, proper implementation of these policies has become a vexing challenge especially in countries like Japan, where banks are playing an increasingly proactive role in fulfilling national security goals to obtain extractive and energy resources.

See also
Environmental issues in the United States

References

External links
 Pacific Environment

Climate change organizations based in the United States
Non-profit organizations based in San Francisco
International environmental organizations
Nature conservation organizations based in the United States
Organizations established in 1987